Soft Aid is a software compilation, released by Quicksilva in March 1985 to support the Famine Relief in Ethiopia. The software was released on tape for the ZX Spectrum and Commodore 64 home computers.

An audio recording of the charity single, Do They Know It's Christmas? by Band Aid also featured on one side of the tape.

The tape was unusual in that it was released to help support a charity (possibly unique in computer gaming at the time). The cover featured artwork by British artist David Rowe,. 

The tape sold in the United Kingdom for £4.99.

Games included

ZX Spectrum

Spellbound
Starbike
Kokotoni Wilf
The Pyramid
Horace Goes Skiing
Gilligan's Gold
Ant Attack
3D Tank Duel
Jack and the Beanstalk
Sorcery

Commodore 64

Gumshoe
Beamrider
Star Trader
Kokotoni Wilf
China Miner
Gilligan's Gold
Fred
Gyropod
Falcon Patrol
Flak

Reception
Soft Aid topped the UK software sales charts for seventeen weeks in 1985, setting a record for the longest number of consecutive weeks at number one. The record was eventually broken by Robocop in 1989.

References

External links

1985 video games
Commodore 64 games
Video games developed in the United Kingdom
ZX Spectrum games
Charity singles
Quicksilva games